The Denison House is a historic house at 427 Garland Avenue in West Helena, Arkansas.  It is a single story brick structure with a broad and shallow hip roof with wide hip-roof dormers, built in 1910 by J. W. Denison, West Helena's first mayor.  It has a wraparound porch supported by Tuscan columns.  It is one of West Helena's finest Colonial Revival houses.

The house was listed on the National Register of Historic Places in 1996.

See also
National Register of Historic Places listings in Phillips County, Arkansas

References

Houses on the National Register of Historic Places in Arkansas
Colonial Revival architecture in Arkansas
Houses completed in 1910
Houses in Phillips County, Arkansas
National Register of Historic Places in Phillips County, Arkansas